These page represents the results at the Cycling Competition at the 1982 Commonwealth Games in Brisbane, Australia.

Medal Tally

Road competition

Individual Road Race (185 km)

Team Time Trial (100 km)

Track competition

1.000m Time Trial

1.000m Match Sprint

4.000m Individual Pursuit

4.000m Team Pursuit

10 Mile Scratch Race

External links
 Results
 CFG Games

1982 Commonwealth Games events
1982
Commonwealth Games
Cycle racing in Australia
1982 in road cycling
1982 in track cycling